The National Association of Intercollegiate Athletics (NAIA) held a men's national ice hockey championship from 1968 to 1984 when ice hockey was dropped as an NAIA sport.

Early history
The NAIA Men's Ice Hockey Championship held a single elimination competition to determined the collegiate national champion from the inaugural 1968 to 1984. The tournament began as a four-team tournament but expanded to six and eight teams during the peak time-frame during the 1970s and early 1980s.  The tournament returned to the 4-team format for the final two seasons with declining hockey participation at the NAIA level. In total, the NAIA sponsored men's ice hockey as a championship sport for 17 years. The schools were consolidated in the Northern United States and the tournament field primarily consisted between schools in Michigan, Minnesota, and Wisconsin, with occasional contenders from New England and Alaska.  NAIA ice hockey also had an international presence in the early years of the championship with membership in Ontario. In total, ice hockey at the NAIA level consisted of between 30 and 50 schools. It was discontinued in 1984 after the NCAA created a Division III national championship.

Tournament format history
1968–1972
 4 teams (single elimination)

1973–1974
 6 teams (single elimination)

1975–1982
 8 teams (single elimination)

1983-1984
 4 teams (single elimination)

Winners of the NAIA national ice hockey championship

Recent history
During the summer of 2015, a group of schools fielding the sport began working with the NAIA administrators in an effort to gain emerging sport status and work to eventually sponsoring the sport at the championship level again. The NAIA requires a minimum of 15 schools to sponsor a sport at the varsity level to begin the process from emerging to championship categories.

In 2016, several NAIA institutions that sponsor men's ice hockey teams announced the formation of a coaches association and a new division for NAIA ice hockey program to begin play during the 2017–18 season. The division will initially operate under the guidance of the American Collegiate Hockey Association (ACHA) during the emerging sport phase of the process to regain NAIA championship sport status. The new division will allow these NAIA schools to align their standards with the institution's other NAIA sports, including distinct differences from the other ACHA divisions in terms of player eligibility, operational procedures, and athletic financial aid.

The Wolverine-Hoosier Athletic Conference (WHAC) made history in July 2017, by adding men's ice hockey as conference sports effective the fall of 2017. The WHAC became the first conference in the NAIA to offer the sport as a conference championship sport.  Initially, the five conference members that sponsor ice hockey will participate in a conference championship. In July 2017, Concordia University Ann Arbor announced that the university will begin an ice hockey program and begin competition in the NAIA Division and WHAC Hockey Conference in the 2018–19 season.

In April 2020, Roosevelt University began to sponsor men's ice hockey after inheriting Robert Morris University's men's team and its ACHA membership because Robert Morris was integrated into Roosevelt a month before.

Current WHAC men's ice hockey teams

Other NAIA schools fielding hockey teams

References

External links 
 NAIA ice hockey

Ice
NAIA Men's Ice Hockey Championship